Carl Rosenblad may refer to:

Carl Rosenblad (equestrian) (1886–1953), Swedish Olympic horse rider
Carl Rosenblad (racing driver) (born 1969), Swedish auto racing driver